= The Prison of Migration =

- Albanian: Burgu i Mërgimit
- Release date: 1990
- Country: Albania
- Language: Albanian

The Prison of Migration (Albanian: Burgu i Mërgimit) is an artistic Albanian film that treats the real situation of the 1990s Albania. It shows the suffering of Albanians away from their country, and trying to stay away from foreign jails of ex-Yugoslavia.
